Hydroglyphus inconstans, is a species of predaceous diving beetle found in India, Bangladesh, Bhutan, Myanmar, Nepal, Sri Lanka, China, Indonesia, Japan, Malaysia, and Taiwan. It is an alkaliphilous beetle species.

References 

Dytiscidae
Insects of Sri Lanka
Insects described in 1892